DPAA is a non-profit 501(c), global digital out-of-home marketing association that functions as a business accelerator and concierge/consultant for its members, which include digital out-of-home networks, their suppliers and the advertising community involved in this media sector.  

DPAA's goal is to drive growth for the industry. The group was started in January 2007 as the Out-of-Home Video Advertising Bureau (OVAB), but changed its name to the Digital Place-based Advertising Association in 2010, and then to DPAA in 2017.

DPAA hosts quarterly "mini-summit" meetings for its members and an annual summit - the 'DPAA Global Summit' FKA 'DPAA Video Everywhere Summit'.  This summit is a fall gathering of advertising agency executives, brand managers, networks and supplier partners devoted to discussing and debating the challenges and opportunities in the digital out-of-home media sector - usually held during New York Digital Signage Week. The DPAA Global Summit is the only event of its kind.  

Barry Frey is president and chief executive officer of DPAA.

François de Gaspé Beaubien, chairman and chief coaching officer of Zoom Media, is chairman of DPAA's board of directors.

References

External links 
 DPAA website

Advertising trade associations